The 1966 World Wrestling Championships were held in Toledo, Ohio, United States.

Medal table

Team ranking

Medal summary

Men's freestyle

Men's Greco-Roman

References
FILA Database

World Wrestling Championships
W
1966 in American sports
1966 in sport wrestling